David Tso is a former Hong Kong international lawn bowler.

Bowls career
Tso has represented Hong Kong at two Commonwealth Games; in the singles event at the 1982 Commonwealth Games and the pairs event at the 1986 Commonwealth Games.

He won six medals at the Asia Pacific Bowls Championships including two gold medals in the 1985 triples at Tweed Heads, New South Wales and the 1991 triples at Kowloon.

He has won the 1994 pairs with George Souza Jr., at the prestigious Hong Kong International Bowls Classic.

References

Hong Kong male bowls players
Living people
Bowls players at the 1982 Commonwealth Games
Bowls players at the 1986 Commonwealth Games
Year of birth missing (living people)